Yang Tae-hwa (born January 13, 1982 in Seoul, South Korea) is a South Korean retired ice dancer. With partner Chuen-Gun Lee, she was the 1999–2002 South Korean national champion. They represented South Korea at the 2002 Winter Olympics, where they placed 24th. Their highest placement at an ISU Championship was 7th at the 2002 Four Continents Championships. Following the 2002 Olympic season, Yang retired from competitive skating.

She is an International Technical Specialist for South Korea.

Competitive highlights
(with Lee)

References

External links
 

1982 births
Living people
South Korean female ice dancers
Olympic figure skaters of South Korea
Figure skaters at the 2002 Winter Olympics
Asian Games medalists in figure skating
Figure skaters at the 1999 Asian Winter Games
Medalists at the 1999 Asian Winter Games
Asian Games bronze medalists for South Korea
Competitors at the 2001 Winter Universiade